Chongtham Sushil Kumar Singh is an India football player. He is currently playing for NEROCA F.C. in Manipur's local statewide league.

Career

Mahindra United
Singh started his footballing career at Mahindra United in the I-League and scored eight goals in eleven games while with Mahindra till Mahindra disbanded.

East Bengal
After Mahindra United disbanded Singh joined another I-League club. This time it was Kingfisher East Bengal F.C. During his first season with East Bengal in 2010-11 Singh played in five games and scored one goal.

United Sikkim
In July 2011 it was reported that United Sikkim F.C. of the I-League 2nd Division have signed Singh on a one-year contract after Singh talked with Baichung Bhutia.

Shillong Lajong
On 25 January 2012 it was announced that Kumar Singh has signed back into the I-League with Shillong Lajong.

Atlético de Kolkata
Signalling his steady decline in match-readiness and age, in July 2015, Singh was drafted to play for Atlético de Kolkata in the 2015 Indian Super League, being ineligible for any of the auctions.

Mumbai FC
He has been signed on by the thrifty Mumbai FC for the I-League2015-16 season where he is on loan from Atletico de Kolkata. He is seen as the fallback forward in the club featuring a few prominent Japanese players. While, his and the club's performance for most of the season has been lacklustre, he has managed to score 4 goals during appearances which did not feature the primary scorer for a team which has been plagued with injuries.

NEROCA FC
He has been signed on by the NEROCA FC from Manipur and scheduled to play in the 2016-17 Durand Cup in Delhi. This is club participates 2-steps below the divisions of the leagues that he has been participating in the last couple of years. While, the club made it to a historic final on its debut at the Durand Cup 2016 riding on the effort of the young manipuri team, the team lost the trophy in penalties to Army Green when Sushil hit a ground sitter to the opposite goalkeeper.

International
Sushil has represented the India national football team on multiple occasions. In 2009, he led the India U-23 team to the 2009 SAFF Championship where he scored from a free kick against Bangladesh to help India go into the finals and face Maldives.
c'è su fifa
Sushil scored his third goal for India's seniors against Qatar in India's historic 2-1 victory away from home. 

Singh was then selected by India for the 2011 SAFF Championship in which he played in two matches, including the final and scored one goal which came in the final which India won 4-0 over Afghanistan on 11 December 2011.

Honours

India
 AFC Challenge Cup: 2008
 SAFF Championship: 2011; runner-up: 2008
 Nehru Cup: 2009

India U23
 SAFF Championship: 2009

References

External links
 
 Profile at Goal.com
 
  at IndianSuperLeague.com

Indian footballers
Association football forwards
India youth international footballers
India international footballers
I-League players
Mahindra United FC players
East Bengal Club players
Footballers from Manipur
Shillong Lajong FC players
United Sikkim F.C. players
Mumbai FC players
Indian Super League players
Mumbai City FC players
ATK (football club) players
1982 births
Living people
Footballers at the 2006 Asian Games
Asian Games competitors for India